Djimy Bend Alexis (born 8 October 1997) is a Haitian professional footballer who plays as a defender for Hapoel Petah Tikva and the Haiti national football team.

Career

Club
On 31 August 2019, Alexis signed for Lori FC on a two-year contract.

On 25 June 2021, Alexis signed for Sektzia Ness Ziona.

On 4 September 2022, Alexis signed for Hapoel Petah Tikva.

International
Alexis made his first international appearance for Haiti against Saint Lucia during a CONCACAF Nations League qualifying match in October 2018.  On 24 June 2019, Alexis conceded an own goal against Costa Rica in the final group stage match of the CONCACAF Gold Cup. Later in the match, Alexis scored his first international goal, securing a top place finish for Haiti in Group B.

Career Statistics

Club

International

Statistics accurate as of match played 15 October 2019

International goals
Scores and results list Haiti's goal tally first.

References

External links

1997 births
Living people
Haitian footballers
FC Lori players
Sektzia Ness Ziona F.C. players
Hapoel Petah Tikva F.C. players
Armenian Premier League players
Liga Leumit players
Haitian expatriate footballers
Expatriate footballers in Armenia
Expatriate footballers in Israel
Haitian expatriate sportspeople in Armenia
Haitian expatriate sportspeople in Israel
Haiti international footballers
Association football defenders
2019 CONCACAF Gold Cup players
People from Cap-Haïtien